Lipni Dol ( or ) is a settlement in the Municipality of Laško in eastern Slovenia. It lies in the valley of a left tributary of the Savinja River, southeast of the town of Laško. The area is part of the traditional region of Styria. It is now included with the rest of the municipality in the Savinja Statistical Region.

References

External links
Lipni Dol on Geopedia

Populated places in the Municipality of Laško